Grandview Township may refer to the following townships in the United States:

 Grandview Township, Edgar County, Illinois
 Grandview Township, Louisa County, Iowa
 Grandview Township, Washington County, Ohio
 Grandview Township, Lyon County, Minnesota
 Grandview Township, Ford County, Kansas